Ameerega ingeri, sometimes known as the Niceforo's poison frog, Brother Niceforo's poison frog, or Inger's poison frog, is a species of frog in the family Dendrobatidae. It is endemic to the Colombian Amazon. It is known with certainty only from its type locality in the Caquetá Department. Records from the Putumayo Department ascribed to this species likely refer to Ameerega bilinguis, although other sources continue to include Putumayo in the range of Ameerega ingeri.

Etymology
The specific name ingeri honors Robert F. Inger, an American zoologist from the Field Museum of Natural History. "Niceforo" in the common name refers to  who collected the type series.

Description
The body is elongate. The eyes are large and prominent. The tympanum is small but distinct. The fingers are long and they relatively small discs and slight lateral fringes; no webbing is present. The toes are long and have slight basal webbing. Skin is dorsally coarsely granular. dorsum in preserved specimens is slate black, but the top of head is little lighter and there are traces of a gray chevron mark in front of eyes. The venter is slate black, with slight indications of a coarse, light reticulation on belly.

Habitat and conservation
It is threatened by habitat loss—the area of the type locality is already deforested.

References

ingeri
Amphibians of Colombia
Endemic fauna of Colombia
Amphibians described in 1970
Taxa named by Doris Mable Cochran
Taxonomy articles created by Polbot